Eucalycoceras is an extinct genus of cephalopods belonging to the Ammonite subclass.

Species
E. collignoni Fabre, 1940 
E. denizoti Fabre, 1940
E. gothicum Kossmat, 1895
E. pentagonus Jukes-Browne, 1896

Description
Eucalycoceras are medium-sized ammonites, generally compressed, with flattened flanks and venter with dense tuberculate ribs.

Distribution
Fossils of this genus have been found in the Cretaceous of Antarctica, Brazil, France, the United Kingdom and United States.

See also
 List of ammonite genera

References

 Tarrantoceras Stephenson and Related Ammonoid Geneva from Cenomanian (Upper Cretaceous) Rocks in Texas and the Western Interior of the United States
 The Paleobiology Database 
 J. Sepkoski Online

Cretaceous ammonites
Acanthoceratidae
Ammonitida genera
Fossils of Brazil
Fossils of the United States
Fossils of France